Two ships of United States Navy were named USS Coghlan for Joseph Bulloch Coghlan:

 , was a destroyer commissioned in 1921 and decommissioned in 1930.
 , was a destroyer, commissioned in 1942 and decommissioned in 1947.

Sources
 

United States Navy ship names